Say It is the second studio album from American recording artist Britt Nicole. It was released May 22, 2007 and features the hit songs, "You", "Believe" and "Set the World On Fire".

Critical reception

About.com's Kim Jones said "bottom line ... Britt Nicole has a winner going with Say It. This girl has it all: talent, drive and a huge heart for ministry. This is one of those faces that you will be seeing a lot more of in the future."

CCM Magazine'''s Meredith Ball wrote "Musically and vocally, this album is solid. The melodies are infectious, and her voice is appropriately raspy without sacrificing vocal flexibility. Say It is a good listen the entire way through."

Cross Rhythms' Tony Cummings said "this is the debut from 2007 which established this precocious pop talent on the US CCM scene but somehow missed the Cross Rhythms reviewing process. Not that that omission stopped your favourite media organisation from selecting five tracks for its radio stations and all of them – "Holiday", "Good Day", "Don't Worry Now", "Say It" and "World That Breaks" – are as catchy confections as you're likely to hear anywhere." In addition, they said the album "all in all, this is still pure pop put together with considerable skill."

Jesus Freak Hideout's Lauren Summerford wrote "Britt Nicole's debut is a solid one. Say It holds a few potential hit singles and lots of excellent material for an energetic live show. Britt is still young and will have plenty of opportunities to grow as an artist, but for now, listening to her Say It will be enough."SoulShine Magazine's Lindsay Whitfield said "Britt has not been this way, she has a certain edge and the mixture of production, vocals, lyrics and the instrumentation – everything-it has a chemistry that works. If you haven't picked up this album yet, do so, this is a 5 star gem for anyone who loves fresh pop/trip hop no matter your market, Britt Nicole is definitely ready to go onwards and upwards in her career."

Track listing

 Personnel 
 Britt Nicole – all vocals 
 Tedd T – programming (1-4, 6-10), bass (3, 8, 10), drums (10)
 Josiah Sherman – keyboards (3, 4, 6, 8, 9, 10)
 Damon Riley – programming (4)
 Josiah Bell – all instruments (5, 11)
 Robert Marvin – all instruments (5, 11)
 Brian Gocher – programming (7)
 Adam Smith – programming (7)
 Eric Lemeire – guitars (2, 3, 4, 6, 8)
 Gabriel Wilson – guitars (2, 4, 6, 10), keyboards (10)
 Joe Pangallo – guitars (4, 7)
 Matt Fennell – guitars (7)
 David May – guitars (11)
 Lynn Nichols – guitars (11)
 Tony Lucido – bass (7, 11)
 Ben Phillps – drums (1, 8)
 Tony Morra – drums (2)
 Dan Needham – drums (7)
 Will Sayles – drums (11)
 David Davidson – viola (7), violin (7)

 Production 
 Tedd T – producer (1-4, 6-10), recording (1-4, 6-10), mixing (9)
 Adam Scott – additional producer (4), producer (7)
 Doubledutch – producers (5, 11), recording (5, 11)
 Ainslie Grosser – recording (1-4, 6-10), mixing (1-4, 6, 8, 10)
 John DeNosky – recording (1-4, 6-10)
 Darrell Lehman – recording (1-4, 6-10)
 Rusty Varenkamp – recording (7)
 Daniel Allen – recording assistant (11)
 Dave Piechura – recording assistant (11)
 Andy Selby – additional editing (5, 11)
 Nathan Watkins – additional editing (11)
 F. Reid Shippen – mixing (5, 11)
 Buckley Miller – mix assistant (5, 11)
 Brian Gardner – mastering 
 Brad O'Donnell – A&R 
 Jan Cook – creative director 
 Tim Frank – art direction
 Alexis Goodman – design 
 Kristin Barlowe – photography

Singles
 2007: "You"
 2007: "Sunshine Girl"
 2007: "Believe"
 2008: "Set the World On Fire"
 2009: "Don't Worry Now" (2008, Australia) 

Charts

Notes
The song "Indestructible" was featured on the album, WOW Next 2007, but was taken off the final track listing for the album.
The song "Come What May" was taken off the final track listing of the album, but was available for a short time on her digital EP Holiday Trio. The EP is available on Rhapsody.
The acoustic mix of "Believe" is available on the album Acoustic Playlist: Bold.
The song "Set the World On Fire" was featured on the albums WOW Hits 2008 and WOW Hits 2009.
 "Sunshine Girl" was included in the soundtrack to :Thrillville: Off the Rails'',

References

2007 albums
Britt Nicole albums
Sparrow Records albums